This is a list of programs aired by the original Craig Wireless incarnation of A-Channel in Canada. For programs aired by the later CHUM Limited/CTVglobemedia incarnation, see List of programs broadcast by CTV and CTV 2.

A-Channel